Brandon Joseph Barash (born October 4, 1979) is an American actor known for playing the role of Johnny Zacchara on the ABC Daytime soap opera General Hospital.

From 2002 to 2004, Barash played Jamie, Paris Geller's boyfriend, in multiple episodes of The WB drama series Gilmore Girls.

Barash first appeared in the contract role of Johnny Zacchara on the ABC soap opera General Hospital in September 2007, and left in March 2013. He returned for several short stints from 2014 to 2016.

In 2015, Barash played Melrose Place actor Thomas Calabro in the Lifetime TV film The Unauthorized Melrose Place Story. He appeared in the recurring role of Detective Robby Oderno in multiple episodes of the TNT police procedural Major Crimes from 2014 to 2016. In 2017, Barash played Ernest Hemingway in the episode "The Lost Generation" of the NBC time travel TV series Timeless. In March 2019, Barash joined the cast of Days of Our Lives, replacing Tyler Christopher in the role of Stefan DiMera. He also played Jake Lambert on the soap.

Barash has also played in the rock group "Port Chuck" along with his former General Hospital co-stars Steve Burton, Scott Reeves, and Bradford Anderson.

Personal life
Barash was born in St. Louis, Missouri, and is the son of Jerry L. Barash, President and CEO of Sysco Food Services of Ventura and his first wife Susan Gale. He has one brother, Jordan B. Barash, and one younger half-sister, Alison L. Barash. His family is Jewish. Barash has lived in Missouri, Texas, and California. He graduated from Memorial High School in Houston, Texas in 1998.

In August 2013, Barash and his former General Hospital co-star Kirsten Storms told People that they had secretly wed in June, and were expecting their first child, a girl, in January 2014. In January 2014, Barash confirmed on Twitter that Storms had given birth to a baby girl. In April 2016, Barash and Storms announced that they had filed for divorce after more than 2 and a half years of marriage, citing irreconcilable differences and saying the separation is amicable.

Filmography

References

External links 
 

1979 births
American male soap opera actors
Jewish American male actors
Male actors from St. Louis
Living people
USC School of Dramatic Arts alumni
21st-century American Jews